Gay is a town in Meriwether County, Georgia, United States. The population was 110 at the 2020 census.

History
An early variant name was "Sasserville". A post office called Gay has been in operation since 1886. The present name is after William F. Gay, an early postmaster. The Georgia General Assembly incorporated the Town of Gay in 1907.

Geography
Gay is located in northeastern Meriwether County at  (33.093797, −84.573924). State Routes 74 and 85 run concurrently through the town, leading north  to Senoia and south  to Woodbury. State Route 109 Spur leads southwest from Gay  to Greenville, the Meriwether county seat.

The Flint River passes  to the east of the town.

Demographics

As of the census of 2000, there were 149 people, 61 households, and 38 families residing in the town. The racial makeup of the town was 56.38% White and 43.62% African American.

There were 61 households, out of which 9.8% had children under the age of 18 living with them, 42.6% were married couples living together, 16.4% had a female householder with no husband present, and 37.7% were non-families. 34.4% of all households were made up of individuals, and 13.1% had someone living alone who was 65 years of age or older. The average household size was 2.44 and the average family size was 3.24.

In the town, the population was spread out, with 16.8% under the age of 18, 7.4% from 18 to 24, 19.5% from 25 to 44, 32.2% from 45 to 64, and 24.2% who were 65 years of age or older. The median age was 48 years. For every 100 females, there were 91.0 males. For every 100 females age 18 and over, there were 85.1 males.

The median income for a household in the town was $26,667, and the median income for a family was $29,583. Males had a median income of $31,875 versus $26,250 for females. The per capita income for the town was $20,840. There were 12.0% of families and 25.5% of the population living below the poverty line, including 82.4% of under eighteens and 17.2% of those over 64.

Arts and culture
The town of Gay hosts a "Cotton Pickin' Fair" on the first weekend of every May and October.

The town was featured in Season 2, Episode 1 of Queer Eye on Netflix.

References

Towns in Meriwether County, Georgia
Towns in Georgia (U.S. state)